The 1972 Copa Interamericana was the 3rd. edition of the Copa Interamericana. The final was contested by Argentine Club Atlético Independiente (champion of 1972 Copa Libertadores) and Hondurean side Olimpia (winner of 1972 CONCACAF Champions' Cup). The final was played under a two-leg format in June, 1973. Both matches were held in Honduras.

In the first leg, hosted at Estadio General Francisco Morazán in San Pedro Sula, Independiente beat Olimpia 2–1. The second leg, hosted at Estadio Tiburcio Carías Andino in Tegucigalpa, was also won by the Argentine team by 2–0. With an aggregate score of 4–1, Independiente won their first Interamericana trophy.

Qualified teams

Venues

Match details

First Leg

Second Leg

References

Copa Interamericana
i
C.D. Olimpia matches
i
i